Lauren Betts (born October 15, 2003) is an American college basketball player for the Stanford Cardinal of the Pac-12 Conference. She played for Grandview High School in Aurora, Colorado, where she was ranked as the No. 1 recruit in her class by ESPN.

Early life and high school career
Betts was born in Vitoria-Gasteiz, Spain and moved around the country during her childhood due to the basketball career of her father, Andrew. Her mother, Michelle, played volleyball for Long Beach State at the college level. When she was in third grade, her family settled in the United States. Before focusing on basketball, Betts was involved in dance, swimming and soccer. She played for Grandview High School in Aurora, Colorado. As a freshman, Betts averaged 12.7 points, 8.6 boards and 3.9 blocks per game for the Class 5A runners-up. In her sophomore season, she averaged 17.8 points, 11.2 rebounds and 3.9 blocks per game, leading her team back to the state title game, which was canceled due to the COVID-19 pandemic. Betts averaged 17.5 points and 11 rebounds per game as a junior, helping Grandview achieve a 17–1 record and reach the Class 5A semifinals. She was named Colorado Gatorade Player of the Year. Betts led her team to the Class 5A state championship in her senior season. She averaged 17.2 points, 11 rebounds and 3.6 blocks per game, winning Women's Basketball Coaches Association High School Player of the Year and repeating as Colorado Gatorade Player of the Year. She played in the McDonald's All-American Game and Jordan Brand Classic.

Recruiting
Betts was considered a five-star recruit and the No. 1 player in the 2022 class by ESPN. On January 13, 2021, she committed to playing college basketball for Stanford over offers from Notre Dame, Oregon, UCLA, UConn and South Carolina.

National team career
Betts won a gold medal with the United States under-16 national team at the 2019 FIBA Under-16 Americas Championship in Chile. She averaged 12.2 points, 13.5 rebounds and 2.5 blocks per game, earning all-tournament honors. Betts was the youngest member of the United States under-19 national team at the 2021 FIBA Under-19 World Cup in Hungary. She averaged 11.1 points, 9.6 rebounds and 1.9 blocks per game en route to a gold medal.

References

External links
USA Basketball bio

2003 births
Living people
American women's basketball players
Basketball players from Colorado
People from Centennial, Colorado
Centers (basketball)
American people of British descent